Nikolay Kolesnikov is the name of:

 Nikolai N. Kolesnikov, Russian physicist
 Nikolay Kolesnikov (weightlifter) (born 1952), Soviet weightlifter
 Nikolay Kolesnikov (sprinter) (born 1953), Soviet sprinter
 Nikolay Kolesnikov (marathoner) (born 1961), Russian marathoner